Yerba buena is a Spanish term meaning "good herb". It may refer to 
 Yerba buena, a number of aromatic plants
 Yerba Buena, Tucumán, the capital of the Yerba Buena Department in the province of Tucumán, Argentina
 Yerba Buena Department, a department of Tucumán Province, Argentina consisting of the city of Yerba Buena and two towns
 Yerba Buena Steam Tram
 Yerbas Buenas, a Chilean town and commune in Linares Province, Maule Region
 Yerba Buena, California, a former town that became San Francisco, California, U.S.
 Yerba Buena Center for the Arts, a contemporary arts and convention center in San Francisco
 Yerba Buena High School, a high school in San Jose, California
 Yerba Buena Island, an island in the San Francisco Bay
 Yerba Buena (band), a fusion band based in New York City
 Yerba Buena Jazz Band, a Dixieland revival band founded by Lu Watters

See also